Jacques Legendre (born 2 December 1941 in Paris) is a French politician and a member of the Senate of France. He represents the Nord department and is a member of the Union for a Popular Movement. He was Secretary of State for Labour and Professional Training from 1977 to 1981.

References 

1941 births
Living people
Politicians from Paris
Union of Democrats for the Republic politicians
Rally for the Republic politicians
Union for a Popular Movement politicians
Gaullism, a way forward for France
Secretaries of State of France
Deputies of the 5th National Assembly of the French Fifth Republic
Deputies of the 6th National Assembly of the French Fifth Republic
Deputies of the 8th National Assembly of the French Fifth Republic
French Senators of the Fifth Republic
Senators of Nord (French department)